Cartledge is a hamlet in Derbyshire, England. Its name is derived from the Old Norse kartr, meaning rocky ground, and the Old English pre 7th-century loecc, meaning boggy stream. It features Cartledge Hall was built c.1585 as a dower house for Alice Burton (née Wolstenholme) and later rebuilt during Elizabethan times.

References

External links
Cartledge at Streetmap.co.uk

Hamlets in Derbyshire
Towns and villages of the Peak District
North East Derbyshire District